Norway is a city in Dickinson County in the U.S. state of Michigan.  The population was 2,845 at the 2010 census. It is part of the Iron Mountain, MI–WI Micropolitan Statistical Area.

The city is in the southwest of Norway Township, but is politically independent. US 8 has its eastern terminus in the city and crosses the Menominee River to continue west in Wisconsin.

History
A post office called Norway was established in 1891. The city was named from a forest of Norway pines near the original town site.

Geography

Transportation

Major Highways

Indian Trails provides daily intercity bus service between St. Ignace and Ironwood, Michigan.

Airport
Ford Airport (Iron Mountain) (KIMT) serves Norway, the county and surrounding communities with both scheduled commercial jet service and general aviation services.

Demographics

2010 census
At the 2010 census there were 2,845 people in 1,256 households, including 765 families, in the city. The racial makup of the city was 97.4% White, 0.8% Native American, 0.2% Asian, 0.2% from other races, and 1.4% from two or more races. Hispanic or Latino of any race were 1.4%.

Of the 1,256 households 29.3% had children under the age of 18 living with them, 44.3% were married couples living together, 11.9% had a female householder with no husband present, 4.7% had a male householder with no wife present, and 39.1% were non-families. 34.2% of households were one person and 16.4% were one person aged 65 or older. The average household size was 2.25 and the average family size was 2.87.

The median age was 41.9 years. 23.5% of residents were under the age of 18; 6.8% were between the ages of 18 and 24; 23.7% were from 25 to 44; 27.4% were from 45 to 64; and 18.5% were 65 or older. The gender makeup of the city was 48.3% male and 51.7% female.

2000 census
At the 2000 census there were 2,959 people in 1,288 households, including 812 families, in the city. The racial makup of the city was 97.53% White, 0.95% Native American, 0.07% Asian, 0.14% Pacific Islander, 0.24% from other races, and 1.08% from two or more races. Hispanic or Latino of any race were 0.78%. 18.7% were of Italian, 14.7% German, 10.0% French, 9.3% Polish, 7.5% Swedish, 7.1% English and 5.6% Irish ancestry according to Census 2000.

Of the 1,288 households 30.0% had children under the age of 18 living with them, 49.1% were married couples living together, 10.2% had a female householder with no husband present, and 36.9% were non-families. 33.0% of households were one person and 17.9% were one person aged 65 or older.  The average household size was 2.30 and the average family size was 2.91.

The age distribution was 25.3% under the age of 18, 6.5% from 18 to 24, 28.4% from 25 to 44, 20.6% from 45 to 64, and 19.2% 65 or older.  The median age was 39 years. For every 100 females, there were 90.7 males.  For every 100 females age 18 and over, there were 86.9 males.

The median household income was $31,059 and the median family income  was $37,533. Males had a median income of $31,595 versus $21,350 for females. The per capita income for the city was $17,681.  About 7.5% of families and 10.8% of the population were below the poverty line, including 14.2% of those under age 18 and 10.1% of those age 65 or over.

Notable people
Richard C. Flannigan, Michigan Supreme Court chief justice
John Ralston, NFL and NCAA football coach
Rudy Rosatti, NFL lineman (Packers and Giants)
Art Van Damme, jazz musician

Points of interest
Norway Speedway is a 1/3-mile paved American Speed Association member track.
Piers Gorge is a 2.6 mile out and back trail located along the Michigan/Wisconsin border known for its whitewater rafting. It is part of the Menominee River State Recreation Area.

References

External links

City of Norway

Cities in Dickinson County, Michigan
Iron Mountain micropolitan area